The Port Eliot Lit Fest is an annual celebration of all things literary taking place at Port Eliot in Cornwall, in the United Kingdom. It was founded by the late Jago Eliot. Guests who have attended the festival in past years are Hanif Kureishi, James Flint, Hari Kunzru and Louis de Bernières.

The 2010 festival, held at the end of July, was widely considered to be the most critically and publicly acclaimed festival yet. Artists and performers included Jakob Dylan, Talvin Singh, Barbara Hulanicki, Grayson Perry, Stephen Jones, Jarvis Cocker and Harper Simon. New acts including the vocal group Fisherman's Friends, the comic performer Wilfredo, and The Book Club Boutique Band also caught the imagination of the Port Eliot audience.

External links

Cornish culture
Festivals in Cornwall
Literary festivals in England